The 1956 Cincinnati Bearcats football team represented the University of Cincinnati as an independent during the 1956 NCAA University Division football season under head coach George Blackburn.

Schedule

References

Cincinnati
Cincinnati Bearcats football seasons
Cincinnati Bearcats football